Gudbrandsdølen Dagningen is a Norwegian newspaper, published in Lillehammer in Innlandet county.

It was formed by the merger of the Gudbrandsdølen and Dagningen newspapers in 1990.

References

1990 establishments in Norway
Mass media in Lillehammer
Newspapers published in Norway
Norwegian-language newspapers
Publications established in 1990